Thomas Simpson (30 November 1937 – 13 July 1967) was one of Britain's most successful professional cyclists. He was born in Haswell, County Durham, and later moved to Harworth, Nottinghamshire. Simpson began road cycling as a teenager before taking up track cycling, specialising in pursuit races. He won a bronze medal for track cycling at the 1956 Summer Olympics and a silver at the 1958 British Empire and Commonwealth Games.

In 1959, at age 21, Simpson was signed by the French professional road-racing team . He advanced to their first team the following year, and won the 1961 Tour of Flanders. Simpson then joined ; in the 1962 Tour de France he became the first British rider to wear the yellow jersey, finishing sixth overall.

In 1965 he became Britain's first professional world road race champion and won the Giro di Lombardia; this made him the BBC Sports Personality of the Year, the first cyclist to win the award. Injuries hampered much of Simpson's 1966 season. He won two stages of the 1967 Vuelta a España before he won the general classification of Paris–Nice that year.

In the thirteenth stage of the 1967 Tour de France, Simpson collapsed and died during the ascent of Mont Ventoux. He was 29 years old. The post-mortem examination found that he had mixed amphetamines and alcohol; this diuretic combination proved fatal when combined with the heat, the hard climb of the Ventoux and a stomach complaint. A memorial near where he died has become a place of pilgrimage for many cyclists. Simpson was known to have taken performance-enhancing drugs during his career, when no doping controls existed. He is held in high esteem by many fans for his character and will to win.

Early life and amateur career

Childhood and club racing

Simpson was born on 30 November 1937 in Haswell, County Durham, the youngest of six children of coal miner Tom Simpson and his wife Alice (née Cheetham). His father had been a semi-professional sprinter in athletics. The family lived modestly in a small terraced house until 1943, when his parents took charge of the village's working men's club and lived above it. In 1950 the Simpsons moved to Harworth on the Nottinghamshire–Yorkshire border, where young Simpson's maternal aunt lived; new coalfields were opening, with employment opportunities for him and older brother Harry, by now, the only children left at home. Simpson rode his first bike, his brother-in-law's, at age 12, sharing it with Harry and two cousins for time trials around Harworth. Following Harry, Tom joined Harworth & District CC (Cycling Club) aged 13. He delivered groceries in the Bassetlaw district by bicycle and traded with a customer for a better road bike. He was often left behind in club races; members of his cycling club nicknamed him "four-stone Coppi", after Italian rider Fausto Coppi, due to his slim physique.

Simpson began winning club time trials, but sensed resentment of his boasting from senior members. He left Harworth & District and joined Rotherham's Scala Wheelers at the end of 1954. Simpson's first road race was as a junior at the Forest Recreation Ground in Nottingham. After leaving school he was an apprentice draughtsman at an engineering company in Retford, using the  commute by bike as training. He placed well in half mile races on grass and cement, but decided to concentrate on road racing. In May 1955 Simpson won the National Cyclists' Union South Yorkshire individual pursuit track event as a junior; the same year, he won the British League of Racing Cyclists (BLRC) junior hill climb championship and placed third in the senior event.

Simpson immersed himself in the world of cycling, writing letters asking for advice. Naturalised Austrian rider George Berger responded, travelling from London to Harworth to help him with his riding position. In late 1955, Simpson ran a red light in a race and was suspended from racing for six months by the BLRC. During his suspension he dabbled in motorcycle trials, nearly quitting cycling but unable to afford a new motorcycle necessary for progress in the sport.

Track years

Berger told Simpson that if he wanted to be a successful road cyclist, he needed experience in track cycling, particularly in the pursuit discipline. Simpson competed regularly at Fallowfield Stadium in Manchester, where in early 1956 he met amateur world pursuit silver medallist Cyril Cartwright, who helped him develop his technique. At the national championships at Fallowfield the 18-year-old Simpson won a silver medal in the individual pursuit, defeating amateur world champion Norman Sheil before losing to Mike Gambrill.

Simpson began working with his father as a draughtsman at the glass factory in Harworth. He was riding well; although not selected by Great Britain for the amateur world championships, he made the 4,000-metre team pursuit squad for the 1956 Olympics. In mid-September, Simpson competed for two weeks in Eastern Europe against Russian and Italian teams to prepare for the Olympics. The seven-rider contingent began with races in Leningrad, continuing to Moscow before finishing in Sofia. He was nicknamed "the Sparrow" by the Soviet press because of his slender build. The following month he was in Melbourne for the Olympics, where the team qualified for the team-pursuit semi-finals against Italy; they were confident of defeating South Africa and France but lost to Italy, taking the bronze medal. Simpson blamed himself for the loss for pushing too hard on a turn and being unable to recover for the next.

After the Olympics, Simpson trained throughout his winter break into 1957. In May, he rode in the national 25-mile championships; although he was the favourite, he lost to Sheil in the final. In a points race at an international event at Fallowfield a week later Simpson crashed badly, almost breaking his leg; he stopped working for a month and struggled to regain his form. At the national pursuit championships, he was beaten in the quarter-finals. After this defeat Simpson returned to road racing, winning the BLRC national hill climb championship in October before taking a short break from racing. In spring 1958 he traveled to Sofia with Sheil for two weeks' racing. On his return he won the national individual pursuit championship at Herne Hill Velodrome. In July, Simpson won a silver medal for England in the individual pursuit at the British Empire and Commonwealth Games in Cardiff, losing to Sheil by one-hundredth of a second in the final. A medical exam taken with the Royal Air Force (RAF) revealed Simpson to be colour blind.

In September 1958, Simpson competed at the amateur world championships in Paris. Against reigning champion Carlo Simonigh of Italy in the opening round of the individual pursuit, he crashed on the concrete track at the end of the race. Simpson was briefly knocked unconscious and sustained a dislocated jaw; however, he won the race since he crashed after the finish line. Although he was in pain, team manager Benny Foster forced Simpson to race in the quarter-final against New Zealand's Warwick Dalton, hoping to unsettle Dalton ahead of a possible meeting with Simpson's teammate Sheil. Simpson wanted to turn professional, but needed to prove himself first, setting his sights on the world amateur indoor hour record. Reg Harris arranged for an attempt at Zürich's Hallenstadion velodrome on Simpson's birthday in November. The following week he travelled to Ghent, in the Flanders region of Belgium, to ride amateur track races. He stayed at the Café Den Engel, run by Albert Beurick, who organised for him to ride at Ghent's Kuipke velodrome in the Sportpaleis (English: Sport Palace).

Simpson decided to move to the continent for a better chance at success, and contacted French brothers Robert and Yvon Murphy, whom he met while racing. They agreed that he could stay with them in the Breton fishing port of Saint-Brieuc. His final event in Britain was at Herne Hill, riding motor-paced races. Simpson won the event and was invited to Germany to train for the 1959 motor-paced world championships, but declined the opportunity in favour of a career on the road. Bicycle manufacturer Elswick Hopper invited him to join their British-based team, but Benny Foster advised him to continue with his plans to move to France.

Move to Brittany

In April 1959, Simpson left for France with £100 savings and two Carlton bikes, one road and one track, given in appreciation of his help promoting the company. His last words to his mother before the move were, "I don't want to be sitting here in twenty years' time, wondering what would have happened if I hadn't gone to France". The next day, his National Service papers were delivered; although willing to serve before his move, he feared the call-up would put his potential career at risk. His mother returned them, with the hope they would understand this.

He applied to local cycling clubs, and joined Club Olympique Briochin, racing with an independent (semi-professional) licence from the British Cycling Federation. When settled with the Murphy family, 21-year-old Simpson met 19-year-old Helen Sherburn, an au pair from Sutton, Yorkshire. Simpson began attracting attention, winning races and criteriums. He was invited to race in the eight-day stage race Route de France by the Saint-Raphaël VC 12e, the amateur club below the professional team . Simpson won the final stage, breaking away from the peloton and holding on for victory. After this win, he declined an offer to ride in the Tour de France for the professional team.

On Simpson's return to Harworth for Christmas, the RAF were notified and the press ran stories on his apparent draft avoidance. He passed a medical in Sheffield, but history repeated itself and the papers arrived the day after his departure for his team's training camp in Narbonne in southern France. The French press, unlike the British, found the situation amusing.

Professional career

1959: Foundations
In July, four months after leaving England, Simpson rode his first race as a professional, the Tour de l'Ouest in west France. He won the fourth stage and took the overall race leader's jersey. He won the next stage's individual time trial, increasing his lead. On the next stage he lost the lead with a punctured tyre, finishing the race in fourteenth place overall.

In August Simpson competed at the world championships in the 5000 m individual pursuit at Amsterdam's large, open-air velodrome and the road race on the nearby Circuit Park Zandvoort motor-racing track. He placed fourth in the individual pursuit, losing by 0.3 seconds in the quarter-finals. He prepared for the  road race, eight laps of the track. After  a ten-rider breakaway formed; Simpson bridged the gap. As the peloton began to close in, he tried to attack. Although he was brought back each time, Simpson placed fourth in a sprint for the best finish to date by a British rider. He was praised by the winner, André Darrigade of France, who thought that without Simpson's work on the front, the breakaway would have been caught. Darrigade helped him enter criteriums for extra money. His fourth place earned Simpson his nickname, "Major Simpson", from French sports newspaper L'Équipe. They ran the headline: "Les carnets du Major Simpson" ("The notes of Major Simpson"), referencing the 1950s series of books, Les carnets du Major Thompson by Pierre Daninos.

Simpson moved up to 's first team, for the end-of-season one-day classic races. In his first appearance in the Giro di Lombardia, one of the five "monuments" of cycling, he retired with a tyre puncture while in the lead group of riders. In Simpson's last race of the season, he finished fourth in the Trofeo Baracchi, a two-man team time trial with Gérard Saint, racing against his boyhood idol, Fausto Coppi; it was Coppi's final race before his death. Simpson finished the season with twenty-eight wins.

1960: Tour de France debut
His first major race of the 1960 season was the one-day "monument" Milan–San Remo in March, in which the organisers introduced the Poggio climb (the final climb) to keep the race from finishing with a bunch sprint. Simpson broke clear from a breakaway group over the first climb, the Turchino, leading the race for  before being caught. He lost contact over the Poggio, finishing in 38th place. In April he moved to the Porte de Clichy district of Paris, sharing a small apartment with his teammate Robinson.

Days after his move, Simpson rode in Paris–Roubaix, known as "The Hell of the North", the first cycling race to be shown live on Eurovision. Simpson rode a lap of honour after the race at the request of the emotional crowd. His televised effort gained him attention throughout Europe. He then won the Mont Faron hill climb and the overall general classification of the Tour du Sud-Est, his first overall win in a professional stage race. He planned to ride in the Isle of Man International road race, excited to see to his home fans. There were rumours, which proved correct, that the Royal Military Police were waiting for him at the airport, so he decided not to travel. This was the last he heard from the authorities regarding his call-up. The British Cycling Federation fined him £25 for his absence.

In June, Simpson made his Grand Tour debut in the Tour de France aged 22. Rapha directeur sportif (team manager) Raymond Louviot opposed his participation, but since the race was contested by national teams Simpson accepted the invitation from the British squad. During the first stage, he was part of a thirteen-rider breakaway which finished over two minutes in front of the field; he crashed on the cinder track at Heysel Stadium in Brussels, finishing thirteenth, but received the same time as the winner. Later that day he finished ninth in the time trial, moving up to fifth place overall. During the third stage Simpson was part of a breakaway with two French riders who repeatedly attacked him, forcing him to chase and use energy needed for the finish; he finished third, missing the thirty-second bonus for a first-place finish, which would have put him in the overall race leader's yellow jersey. He dropped to ninth overall by the end of the first week. During stage ten, Simpson crashed descending the Col d'Aubisque in the Pyrenees but finished the stage in fourteenth place. In the following stage he was dropped, exhausted, from a chasing group; failing to recover. He finished the Tour in twenty-ninth place overall, losing  in weight over the three weeks.

After the Tour, Simpson rode criteriums around Europe until crashing in central France; he returned home to Paris and checked himself into a hospital. Following a week's bed-rest, he rode in the road world championships at the Sachsenring in East Germany. During the race Simpson stopped to adjust his shoes on the right side of the road and was hit from behind by a car, sustaining a cut to his head which required five stitches. In the last of the classics, the Giro di Lombardia, he struggled, finishing eighty-fourth. Simpson had been in constant contact with Helen, who was now working in Stuttgart, Germany, meeting with her between races. They became engaged on Christmas Day, and originally planned to marry at the end of 1961, but in fact wed on 3 January 1961 in Doncaster, Yorkshire.

1961: Tour of Flanders and injury
Simpson's first major event of the 1961 season was the Paris–Nice stage race in March. In stage three he helped his team win the team time trial and took the general classification lead by three seconds; however, he lost it in the next stage. In the final stages of the race Simpson's attacks were thwarted, and he finished fifth overall.

On 26 March, Simpson rode in the one-day Tour of Flanders. With 's Nino Defilippis, he chased down an early breakaway. The finish, three circuits around the town of Wetteren, was flat; Defilippis, unlike Simpson, was a sprinter and was expected to win. One kilometre from the finish, Simpson launched a sprint; he eased off with 300 m to go, tricking Defilippis into thinking he was exhausted. As Defilippis passed, Simpson jumped again to take victory, becoming the first Briton to win a "monument" classic. Defilippis protested that the finishing banner had been blown down, and he did not know where the finish was; however, the judges noted that the finish line was clearly marked on the road itself. Defilippis' team asked Simpson to agree to a tie, saying no Italian had won a classic since 1953. He replied: "An Englishman had not won one since 1896!"

A week later, Simpson rode in Paris–Roubaix in the hope of bettering his previous year's ninth place. As the race reached the paved section he went on a solo attack, at which point he was told that  rider Raymond Poulidor was chasing him down. Simpson increased his speed, catching the publicity and press vehicles ahead (known as the caravane). A press car swerved to avoid a pothole; this forced him into a roadside ditch. Simpson fell, damaging his front wheel and injuring his knee. He found his team car and collected a replacement wheel, but by then the front of the race had passed. Back in the race he crashed twice more, finishing 88th.

At Simpson's next race, the four-day Grand Prix d'Eibar, his first in Spain, his knee injury still bothered him. He won the second stage, but was forced to quit during the following stage. His injury had not healed, even after treatment by various specialists, but for financial reasons he was forced to enter the Tour de France with the British team. He abandoned on stage three, which started in Roubaix, struggling to pedal on the cobbles. Three months after his fall at Paris–Roubaix he saw a doctor at St. Michael's Hospital in Paris. He gave Simpson injections in his knee, which reduced the inflammation. Once healed, he competed in the road world championships in Berne, Switzerland. On the track he qualified for the individual pursuit with the fourth-fastest time, losing in the quarter-finals to Peter Post of the Netherlands. In the road race, Simpson was part of a seventeen-rider breakaway that finished together in a sprint; he crossed the line in ninth place.

Helen became pregnant; Simpson's apartment in Paris was now unsuitable and a larger home in France was not in their means. In October, with help from his friend, Albert Beurick, they moved into a small cottage in Ghent. Low on funds, Simpson earned money in one-day track races in Belgium.

1962: Yellow jersey
Simpson's contract with Rapha-Gitane-Dunlop had ended with the 1961 season. After training camp at Lodève in southern France, he rode in Paris–Nice. He helped his team win the stage-3a team time trial and finished second overall, behind 's Jef Planckaert. He was unable to ride in Milan–San Remo when its organisers limited the race to Italian-based teams; instead he rode in Gent–Wevelgem, finishing sixth, then defended his Tour of Flanders title. At the end of the latter, Simpson was in a select group of riders at the head of the race. Although he led over each of the final climbs, at the finish he finished fifth and won the King of the Mountains prize. A week later Simpson finished thirty-seventh in Paris–Roubaix, delayed by a crash.

Coming into the Tour de France, Simpson was leader of his team; it was the first time since 1929 that company teams were allowed to compete. He finished ninth in the first stage, in a group of twenty-two riders who finished over eight minutes ahead of the rest. During stage 8a he was in a thirty-rider group which gained about six minutes, moving him to second overall behind teammate André Darrigade. At the end of the eleventh stage Simpson was third in the overall, over a minute behind race leader Willy Schroeders and fifty-one seconds behind Darrigade. Stage twelve from Pau to Saint-Gaudens, the hardest stage of the 1962 Tour (known as the "Circle of Death"), was the Tour's first mountain stage. Simpson saw an opportunity to lead the race. The team now solely concentrated on his interests, since Darrigade was a sprinter and would no longer be involved in the general classification. As the peloton reached the Col du Tourmalet, Simpson attacked with a small group of select riders, finishing eighteenth place in a bunch sprint. As he finished ahead of all the other leaders in the general classification, he became the overall new leader of race, and the first British rider to wear the leader's yellow jersey. Simpson lost the lead on the following stage, a short time trial ending with a steep uphill finish at Superbagnères. He finished thirty-first and dropped to sixth overall. On stage nineteen he advanced recklessly descending the Col de Porte in the Alps, crashing on a bend and only saved from falling over the edge by a tree, leaving him with a broken left middle finger. He lost almost eleven minutes in the next stage's time trial, finishing the Tour at Paris' Parc des Princes stadium 17 minutes and 9 seconds behind in 6th place.

After the Tour Simpson rode criteriums before the road world championships in Salò, Italy, where he retired after missing a large breakaway. He began riding six-day track races into his winter break. In December he made an appearance at the Champions' Concert cycling awards held at Royal Albert Hall in London. Separately, he won the British Cycling Federation's Personality of the Year. Simpson and Helen were expecting their second child and upgraded to a larger house in Sint-Amandsberg, a sub-municipality of Ghent.

1963: Bordeaux–Paris
Leroux withdrew its sponsorship of the Gitane team for the 1963 season. Simpson was contracted to their manager, Raymond Louviot; Louviot was rejoining  and Simpson could follow, but he saw that as a step backwards.  bought the contract from Louviot, which ran until the end of the season. Simpson's season opened with Paris–Nice; he fell out of contention after a series of tyre punctures in the opening stages, using the rest of the race as training. He withdrew from the race on the final stage to rest for his next race, Milan–San Remo; after breaking away by himself he stopped beside the road, which annoyed his fellow riders. At Milan–San Remo, Simpson was in a four-rider breakaway; his tyre punctured, and although he got back to the front, he finished nineteenth. He placed third in the Tour of Flanders in a three-rider sprint. In Paris–Roubaix Simpson worked for teammate, and winner, Emile Daems, finishing ninth. Simpson's bike slipped a gear, and Stablinski stayed away for the victory. After his second-place finish, Simpson led the Super Prestige Pernod International season-long competition for world's best cyclist. The following week he raced in the Ardennes classics, placing thirty-third in Liège–Bastogne–Liège, after he rode alone for about  before being caught in the closing kilometres.

On 26 May, Simpson rode in the one-day,  Bordeaux–Paris. Also known as the "Derby of the Road", it was the longest he had ever ridden. The race began at 1:58 am; the initial  were unpaced until the town of Châtellerault, where dernys (motorised bicycles) paced each rider to the finish. Simpson broke away in a group of three riders. Simpson's pacer, Fernand Wambst, increased his speed, and Simpson dropped the other two. Simpson attacked, and with  remaining, opening a margin of two minutes. His lead steadily increased, and he finished in the Parc des Princes over five minutes ahead of teammate Piet Rentmeester.

Simpson announced that he would not ride the Tour de France, concentrating on the world road championships instead. Before, he won the Isle of Man International in treacherous conditions where only sixteen out of seventy riders finished. At the road world championships in Ronse, Belgium, the Belgians controlled the race until Simpson broke free, catching two riders ahead: Henry Anglade (France) and Shay Elliott (Ireland). Anglade was dropped, and Elliott refused to work with Simpson. They were caught; the race finished in a bunch sprint, with Simpson crossing the line in 29th. Simpson's season ended with six-day races across Europe and an invitation only race on the Pacific island of New Caledonia, along with other European riders. He skipped his usual winter training schedule for his first skiing holiday at Saint-Gervais-les-Bains in the Alps, taking Helen and his two young daughters, Jane and Joanne.

1964: Milan–San Remo
After a training camp near Nice in southern France Simpson rode in the one-day Kuurne–Brussels–Kuurne in Belgium, finishing second to 's Arthur Decabooter. The conditions were so cold, he only completed the race to keep warm. Albert Beurick started Simpson's supporters club at the Café Den Engel, raising £250 for him in the first nine months. In Paris–Nice, his tyre punctured during stage four, losing five minutes and used the rest of the race for training.

On 19 March, two days later, Simpson rode in Milan–San Remo. Before the race, French journalist René de Latour advised Simpson not to attack early: "If you feel good then keep it for the last hour of the race." On final climb, the Poggio, Poulidor launched a series of attacks on the group; only Simpson managed to stay with him and they crossed the summit and descended into Milan.

Simpson spent the next two months training for the Tour de France at the end of June. After the first week of the Tour, Simpson was in tenth place overall. On the ninth stage, he was part of 22-rider breakaway which finished together at Monaco's Stade Louis II; he placed second to Anquetil, moving up to eighth overall. The next day, he finished 20th in the  time trial. During the 16th stage, which crossed four cols, Simpson finished 33rd, 25 minutes and 10 seconds behind the stage winner, and dropped to 17th overall. He finished the Tour in 14th place overall. Simpson later discovered that he rode the Tour suffering from tapeworms.

After the race, Simpson prepared for the world road championships with distance training and criteriums. At the world championships on 3 September, the  road race consisted of twenty-four laps of a varying circuit at Sallanches in the French Alps. Simpson crashed on the third lap while descending in wet conditions, damaging a pedal. He got back to the peloton, launching a solo attack on a descent; he then chased down the group of four leaders with two laps to go. On the last lap he was dropped by three riders, finishing six seconds behind. On 17 October, Simpson rode in the Giro di Lombardia. Halfway through the race he was given the wrong musette (bag) by his team in the feed zone, and threw it away. With the head of the race reduced to five riders, Molteni's Gianni Motta attacked. Simpson was the only one who could follow, but he began to feel the effects of not eating. Motta gave him part of his food, which sustained him for a while. On the final climb Simpson led Motta, but was exhausted. Over the remaining  of flat terrain, Motta dropped him; Simpson cracked, and was repeatedly overtaken, finishing twenty-first. He closed the year riding track races.

1965: World championship and Lombardia
The Simpson family spent Christmas in England, before a trip to Saint-Gervais-les-Bains, where Simpson injured himself skiing, suffering a broken foot and a sprained ankle. He recovered, riding six-day races. At the Antwerp six-day, he dropped out on the fourth day with a cold. His cold worsened and he missed most of March. He abandoned Milan–San Remo at the foot of the Poggio. On 11 April, he finished seventh in Paris–Roubaix after crashing in the lead group. The crash forced him to miss the Tour of Flanders as he struggled to walk on his injured foot. In Liège–Bastogne–Liège he attacked with 's Felice Gimondi, catching an early break. Simpson rode alone before slipping on oil mixed with water; he stayed with the front group, finishing tenth.

He followed with an appearance at Bordeaux–Paris. François Mahé went on a lone break, Simpson attacked in pursuit, followed by Jean Stablinski. Simpson's derny broke down, and he was delayed changing motorbikes. He caught Stablinski, and was joined by Anquetil. Outside Paris Mahé was caught and dropped, after  on his own. Anquetil won the race by fifty-seven seconds ahead of Stablinski, who beat Simpson in a sprint. Peugeot manager Gaston Plaud ordered Simpson to ride the Midi Libre stage race to earn a place in the Tour de France, and he finished third overall. The 1965 Tour was considered open due to Anquetil's absence, and Simpson was among the riders favoured by L'Équipe. During stage nine he injured his hand crashing on the descent of the Col d'Aubisque in the Pyrenees, finishing tenth in the stage and seventh in general classification. Simpson developed bronchitis after stage fifteen and cracked on the next stage, losing nearly nineteen minutes. His hand became infected, but he rode the next three stages before the Tour doctor stopped him from racing. He was taken to hospital, where they operated on his hand and treated him for blood poisoning, bronchitis and a kidney infection.

After ten days off his bike, Simpson was only contracted to three post-Tour criteriums. His training for the road world championships included kermesse circuit races in Flanders. Simpson's last race before the world championships was the Paris–Luxembourg stage race, riding as a super-domestique (lieutenant). On 5 September, Simpson rode in the road race at the world championships in San Sebastián, Spain. The race was a  hilly circuit of fourteen laps. The British team had no support; Simpson and his friend Albert Beurick obtained food and drink by stealing from other teams. During the first lap, a strong break was begun by British rider Barry Hoban. As his lead stretched to one minute, Simpson and teammates Vin Denson and Alan Ramsbottom bridged the gap, followed by Germany's Rudi Altig. Hoban kept the pace high enough to prevent any of the favourites from joining. Simpson and Altig broke clear with two-and-a-half laps remaining, staying together until the final kilometre, when Simpson launched his sprint; he held off Altig for victory by three bike lengths, becoming the first British professional world road race champion.

On 16 October, Simpson rode in the Giro di Lombardia, which featured five mountain passes. He escaped with Motta, and dropped him before the finish in Como to win his third "monument" classic over three minutes ahead of the rest. Simpson was the second world champion to win in Italy; the first was Alfredo Binda in 1927. Simpson was offered lucrative contracts by teams, including  who were prepared to pay him the year's salary in advance. He could not escape his contract with Peugeot, which ran until the end of the 1967 season. For the next three weeks he rode contract races, riding an estimated . He rode 18 races, with each earning him £300–£350.

Simpson ended the year second to Anquetil in the Super Prestige Pernod International, and won the Daily Express Sportsman of the Year, the Sports Journalists' Association Sportsman of the Year, presented by the Prime Minister Harold Wilson, and the BBC Sports Personality of the Year. In British cycling Simpson won the British Cycling Federation Personality of the Year and the Bidlake Memorial Prize. He was given the freedom of Sint-Amandsberg; his family, including his parents, were driven in an open-top car along the crowd-lined route from the Café Den Engel to the Town Hall.

1966: An injury-ridden season
As in the previous winter, Simpson went on a skiing holiday. On 25 January he fell, breaking his right tibia, and his leg was in a plaster cast until the end of February. He missed contract races, crucial training and most of the spring classics. Simpson began riding again in March, and in late April started, but did not finish, Liège–Bastogne–Liège.

Simpson's injury did not stop the press from naming him a favourite for the Tour de France. He was subdued in the race until stage twelve, when he forced a breakaway with Altig (Molteni), finishing second. Simpson again finished second in the next stage, jumping clear of the peloton in a three-rider group in the final kilometres. After the stage he was eighteenth overall, over seven minutes down. Simpson moved up to 16th after finishing 5th in stage 14b – a short time trial. As the race reached the Alps, he decided to make his move. During stage sixteen he attacked on the descent of the first of three cols, the Croix de Fer. He crashed but continued, attacking again. Simpson was joined by 's Julio Jiménez on the climb of the Télégraphe to the Galibier. Simpson was caught by a chase group descending the Galibier before he crashed again, knocked off his bike by a press motorcycle. The crash required five stitches in his arm. The next day he struggled to hold the handlebars and could not use the brake lever with his injured arm, forcing him to abandon. His answer to journalists asking about his future was, "I don't know. I'm heartbroken. My season is ruined."

After recovering from his injury Simpson rode 40 criteriums in 40 days, capitalising on his world championship and his attacks in the Tour. He retired from the road world championships at the Nürburgring with cramp. His road season ended with retirements from autumn classics Paris–Tours and the Giro di Lombardia. He rode six-day races, finishing fourteenth in the winter rankings. The misfortune he endured during the season made him the first rider named as a victim of the "curse of the rainbow jersey". For the winter Simpson took his family to the island of Corsica, planning the build of his retirement home.

1967: Paris–Nice and Vuelta stages
Simpson's primary objective for 1967 was overall victory in the Tour de France; in preparation, he planned to ride stage races instead of one-day classics. Simpson felt his chances were good because this Tour was contested by national, rather than professional teams. He would lead the British team, which – although one of the weakest – would support him totally, unlike Peugeot. During Simpson's previous three years with Peugeot, he was only guaranteed a place on their Tour team if he signed with them for the following year. Free to join a new team for the 1968 season, he was offered at least ten contracts; Simpson had a verbal agreement with Italian team Salvarani, and would share its leadership with Felice Gimondi. In an interview with Cycling (now Cycling Weekly) journalist, Ken Evans, in April, Simpson revealed his intention to attempt the hour record in the 1967 season. He also said he wanted retire from road racing aged 33, to ride on the track and spend more time with his family.

In March he rode in the Paris–Nice. After stage two his teammate, Eddy Merckx, took the overall lead. Simpson moved into the lead the next day as part of a breakaway, missed by Merckx, which finished nearly twenty minutes ahead. Merckx thought Simpson double-crossed him, but Simpson was a passive member of the break. At the start of stage six, Simpson was in second place behind 's Rolf Wolfshohl. Merckx drew clear as the race approached Mont Faron, with Simpson following. They stayed together until the finish in Hyères, with Simpson allowing Merckx to take first place. Simpson finished over a minute ahead of Wolfshohl, putting him in the race leader's white jersey. He held the lead in the next two stages to win the race. Three days later Simpson and Merckx both raced in Milan–San Remo. After  of Paris–Roubaix, Simpson's bike was unridable and he retired from the race.

In late April Simpson rode in his first Vuelta a España, using the eighteen-stage race to prepare for the Tour. During stage two a breakaway group gained over thirteen minutes, dashing his hopes for a high placing. Simpson nearly quit the race before the fifth stage, from Salamanca to Madrid, but rode it because it was easier to get home by air from Madrid. He won the stage, attacking from a breakaway, and finished second in stage seven. On the eleventh stage, concluding in Andorra, Simpson rode away from the peloton on his own. With  remaining, he began to lose control of his bike and was halted by Peugeot manager Gaston Plaud until he had recovered, by which time the race had passed. In an interview with L'Équipe'''s Philippe Brunel in February 2000, Tour de France physician Pierre Dumas revealed that Simpson told him that he was taken to hospital during the Vuelta. Simpson won stage sixteen, which ended in San Sebastián, and finished the Vuelta thirty-third overall.

Simpson was determined to make an impact in the Tour de France; in his eighth year as a professional cyclist, he hoped for larger appearance fees in post-Tour criteriums to help secure his financial future after retirement. His plan was to finish in the top three, or to wear the yellow jersey at some point in the race. He targeted three key stages, one of which was the thirteenth, over Mont Ventoux, and planned to ride conservatively until the race reached the mountains. In the prologue, Simpson finished thirteenth. After the first week he was in sixth place overall, leading the favourites. As the race crossed the Alps, Simpson fell ill, across the Col du Galibier, with diarrhoea and stomach pains. Unable to eat, he finished stage ten in 16th place and dropped to seventh overall as his rivals passed him. Teammate Vin Denson advised Simpson to limit his losses and accept what he had. He placed in 39th position on stage 11 and 7th on stage 12. In Marseille, on the evening before stage thirteen, Simpson's manager, Daniel Dousset, pressured him for good results. Plaud begged Simpson to quit the race.

Death

The thirteenth stage (13 July) of the 1967 Tour de France measured ; it started in Marseille, crossing Mont Ventoux (the "Giant of Provence") before finishing in Carpentras. At dawn, Tour doctor Pierre Dumas met journalist Pierre Chany near his hotel. Dumas noted the warm temperature, "If the boys stick their nose in a 'topette' [bag of drugs] today, we could have a death on our hands." At the start line, a journalist noticed Simpson looked tired and asked him if the heat was the problem. Simpson replied, "No, it's not the heat, it's the Tour."

As the race reached the lower slopes of Ventoux, Simpson's team mechanic Harry Hall, witnessed Simpson, still ill, putting the lid back on his water bottle as he exited a building. Race commissaire (official) Jacques Lohmuller later confirmed to Hall that he also saw the incident and that Simpson was putting brandy in his bottle. Near the summit of Ventoux, the peloton began to fracture. Simpson was in the front group before slipping back to a group of chasers about a minute behind. He then began losing control of his bike, zig-zagging across the road. A kilometre from the summit, Simpson fell off his bike. Team manager Alec Taylor and Hall arrived in the team car to help him. Hall tried to persuade Simpson to stop, saying: "Come on Tom, that's it, that's your Tour finished", but Simpson said he wanted to continue. Taylor said, "If Tom wants to go on, he goes". Noticing his toe straps were still undone, Simpson said, "Me straps, Harry, me straps!" They got him on his bike and pushed him off. Simpson's last words, as remembered by Hall, were "On, on, on." Hall estimated Simpson rode a further  before he began to wobble, and was held upright by spectators; he was unconscious, with his hands locked on the handlebars. Hall and a nurse from the Tour's medical team took turns giving Simpson mouth-to-mouth resuscitation, before Dumas arrived with an oxygen mask. Approximately forty minutes after his collapse, a police helicopter took Simpson to nearby Avignon hospital, where he was pronounced dead at 5:40 p.m. Two empty tubes and a half-full one of amphetamines, one of which was labelled "Tonedron", were found in the rear pocket of his jersey. The official cause of death was "heart failure caused by exhaustion."

On the next racing day, the other riders were reluctant to continue racing and asked the organisers for a postponement. France's Stablinski suggested that the race continue, with a British rider, whose team would wear black armbands, allowed to win the stage. Hoban won the stage, although many thought the stage winner should have been Denson, Simpson's close friend. Media reports suggested that his death was caused by heat exhaustion, until, on 31 July 1967 British journalist J. L. Manning of the Daily Mail broke the news about a formal connection between drugs and Simpson's death. French authorities confirmed that Simpson had traces of amphetamine in his body, impairing his judgement and allowing him to push himself beyond his limits. His death contributed to the introduction of mandatory testing for performance-enhancing drugs in cycling, leading to tests in 1968 at the Giro d'Italia, Tour de France and Summer Olympics. Simpson was buried in Harworth Cemetery, after a service at the 12th-century village church attended by an estimated 5,000 mourners, including Peugeot teammate Eddy Merckx, the only continental rider in attendance. The epitaph on Simpson's gravestone in Harworth cemetery reads, "His body ached, his legs grew tired, but still he would not give in", taken from a card left by his brother, Harry, following his death.

Doping
Unlike the majority of his contemporaries, Simpson was open about the use of drugs in professional cycling. In 1960, interviewed by Chris Brasher for The Observer newspaper, Simpson spoke about his understanding of how riders could beat him, saying: "I know from the way they ride the next day they are taking dope. I don't want to have to take it – I have too much respect for my body." Two years before his death, Simpson hinted in the newspaper, The People, at drug-taking in races, although he implied that he himself was not involved. Asked about drugs by Eamonn Andrews on the BBC Home Service radio network, Simpson did not deny taking them; however, he said that a rider who frequently took drugs might get to the top but would not stay there.

In his biography of Simpson, Put Me Back on My Bike, William Fotheringham quoted Alan Ramsbottom as saying, "Tom went on the [1967] Tour de France with one suitcase for his kit and another with his stuff, drugs and recovery things", which Fotheringham said was confirmed by Simpson's roommate Colin Lewis. Ramsbottom added, "Tom took a lot of chances. He took a lot of it [drugs]. I remember him taking a course of strychnine to build up to some big event. He showed me the box, and had to take one every few days." although he implied that other competitors were involved. Lewis recalled Simpson acquiring a small box at their hotel. Simpson explained to him: "That's my year's supply of Micky Finns'. That lot cost me £800."

Commentator and Simpson's close friend David Saunders stated in his 1971 book, Cycling in the Sixties, that although he did not condone Simpson's use of drugs, he thought it was not the reason for his death. He said: "I am quite convinced that Simpson killed himself because he just did not know when to stop. All his racing life he had punished his frail body, pushing it to the limits of endurance with his tremendous will-power and single-mindedness and, on Mont Ventoux, he pushed it too far, perhaps the drug easing the pain of it all." Saunders went on to say that Simpson was not alone in the taking of drugs in professional cycling and that the authorities ignored their use. His opinion was that Simpson did not take drugs to gain an unfair advantage, but because "he was not going to be beaten by a pill".

Riding style and legacy
Simpson in his adolescence was described as fearsome in descent by fellow Scala Wheelers club member George Shaw, who explained that if Simpson dropped behind on a climb, he would come back on the descent. Simpson's risk-taking on descents was evident throughout his career, crashing in four out of the seven Tours de France he competed in. Track rider Norman Sheil recalled: "When racing on a banked velodrome, Simpson would sometimes ride up the advertising boards at the top of the bankings, Wall of Death-style, to please the crowds." Simpson's death was attributed to his unwillingness to admit defeat ascending Mont Ventoux. He described a near-death experience during a race in 1964, the Trofeo Baracchi two-man time trial, to Vin Denson, who recalled: "He said he felt peace of mind and wasn't afraid to die. He said he would have been happy dying."

Simpson looked for any advantage over his opponents. He made his own saddle, a design which is now standard. During his time with Peugeot, he rode bikes made by Italian manufacturer Masi that resembled Peugeots. Simpson was obsessed with dieting since 1956, when he was mentored by Cyril Cartwright. Simpson understood the value of fruit and vegetables after reading Les Cures de jus by nutritionist Raymond Dextreit; during the winter, he would consume  of carrots a day. Other unusual food preferences included pigeons, duck and trout skin, raspberry leaves and garlic in large quantities.

In the 1968 Tour de France, there was a special prize given in his honour, the Souvenir Tom Simpson, a sprint on stage 15 in the small town of Mirepoix, won by the soloing Roger Pingeon. Winner of the race Jan Janssen said of him, "Occasionally Tommy could be annoying. When it was rolling along at 30kmh and - paf!… he’d attack. Oh leave us alone! There's still 150km to go pipe down. But often, he wanted war." Janssen went on to say, "Even in the feed zones. It's not the law, but it's not polite. Musettes (lunch bags) were up in the air there was panic and crashes. It was Simpson acting like a jerk. It didn't happen often. Occasionally I was angry at him. I’d say to him in his native English: You f*****g c**t... There were often many teams, five or six, in the same hotel together every evening. Each had their own table. And at a certain moment, Tommy walked into the restaurant like a gentleman, with a cane, bowler hat and in costume… He was like a Lord in England and the rest of us were in tracksuits. Everyone saw that, laughed, and the things he had done during the race were forgotten."

A granite memorial to Simpson, with the words "Olympic medallist, world champion, British sporting ambassador", stands on the spot where he collapsed and died on Ventoux, one kilometre east of the summit. Cycling began a fund for a monument a week after Simpson's death, raising about £1,500. The memorial was unveiled in 1968. It has become a site of pilgrimage for cyclists, who frequently leave cycling-related objects, such as water bottles and caps, in tribute. In nearby Bédoin, a plaque was installed in the town square by journalists following the 1967 Tour. The Harworth and Bircotes Sports and Social Club has a small museum dedicated to Simpson, opened by Belgian cyclist Lucien Van Impe in August 2001. In 1997, to commemorate the 30th anniversary of his death, a small plaque was added to the Mont Ventoux memorial, with the words "There is no mountain too high. Your daughters Jane and Joanne, July 13, 1997", and a replica of the memorial was erected outside the museum. In his adopted hometown of Ghent, there is a bust of Simpson at the entrance to the Kuipke velodrome. Every year since his death, the Tom Simpson Memorial Race has taken place in Harworth.

Ray Pascoe, a fan, made the 1995 film Something To Aim At, a project he began in the years following Simpson's death; the film includes interviews with those closest to Simpson. The 2005 documentary Wheels Within Wheels follows actor Simon Dutton as he searches for people and places in Simpson's life. Dutton's four-year project chronicles the midlife crisis that sparked his quest to rediscover Simpson. British rider David Millar won stage twelve of the 2012 Tour de France on the 45th anniversary of Simpson's death; previously banned from cycling for using performance-enhancing drugs, he paid tribute to Simpson and reinforced the importance of learning from his – and Simpson's – mistakes. Millar wrote the introduction for a reissue of Simpson's autobiography, Cycling Is My Life, published in 2009. In 2010, Simpson was inducted into the British Cycling Hall of Fame. He inspired Simpson Magazine, which began in March 2013. According to the magazine's creators, “It was Simpson's spirit and style, his legendary tenacity and his ability to suffer that endeared him to cycling fans everywhere as much as the trophies he won.”

Family and interests
Soon after moving to France in 1959 Simpson met Helen Sherburn. They married in 1961, before moving to Ghent, Belgium, the following year. They had two daughters, Jane (born April 1962) and Joanne (born May 1963), who were brought up, and live, in Belgium. After his death, Helen Simpson married Barry Hoban in December 1969. Simpson is the maternal uncle of retired Belgian-Australian cyclist Matthew Gilmore, whose father, Graeme, was also a cyclist. The 2000 book Mr. Tom: The True Story of Tom Simpson, written by Simpson's nephew, Chris Sidwells, focuses on his career and family life.

Simpson spoke fluent French, and was also competent in Flemish and Italian. In January 1966, Simpson was a guest castaway on BBC Radio 4's Desert Island Discs; his favourite musical piece was "Ari's Theme" from Exodus by the London Festival Orchestra, his book choice was The Pickwick Papers and his luxury item was golf equipment. Helen said that she chose his records for the show, since he was not interested in music. Simpson's autobiography, Cycling Is My Life, was first published in 1966.

Career achievements
Major results

Sources:

1955
 1st  BLRC National Junior Hill Climb Championship
1956
 2nd Individual pursuit, Amateur National Track Championships
 3rd  Team pursuit, Olympic Games
1957
 1st  BLRC National Hill Climb Championship
 1st  Individual pursuit, Amateur National Track Championships
1958
 1st  Individual pursuit, Amateur National Track Championships
 2nd  Individual pursuit, British Empire and Commonwealth Games
1959
 1st Stage 8 Route de France
 Tour de l'Ouest
1st Stages 4 & 5b (ITT)
 2nd Overall Essor Breton
 4th Road race, UCI Road World Championships
 4th Trofeo Baracchi (with Gérard Saint)
1960
 1st Overall Tour du Sud-Est
 1st Stage 1b (TTT) Four Days of Dunkirk
 1st Mont Faron hill climb
 3rd Overall Genoa–Rome
1st Mountains classification
 7th La Flèche Wallonne
 9th Paris–Roubaix
1961
 1st Tour of Flanders
 1st Stage 2 Euskal Bizikleta
 2nd Overall Menton–Rome
 5th Overall Paris–Nice
1st Stage 3 (TTT)
 9th Road race, UCI Road World Championships
1962
 2nd Overall Paris–Nice
1st Stage 3a (TTT)
 3rd Critérium des As
 3rd Six Days of Madrid (with John Tresidder)
 5th Tour of Flanders
1st Mountains classification
 6th Overall Tour de France
Held  after Stage 12
 6th Gent–Wevelgem
1963
 1st Bordeaux–Paris
 2nd Overall Tour du Var
1st Stage 1
 1st Isle of Man International
 1st Grand Prix du Parisien
 2nd Critérium des As
 2nd Gent–Wevelgem
 2nd Paris–Brussels
 2nd Overall Super Prestige Pernod International
 2nd Paris–Tours
 3rd Tour of Flanders
 8th Paris–Roubaix
 10th La Flèche Wallonne
 10th Giro di Lombardia
1964
 1st Milan–San Remo
 1st Stage 5 Circuit de Provençal
 2nd Kuurne–Brussels–Kuurne
 3rd Trofeo Baracchi (with Rudi Altig)
 4th Road race, UCI Road World Championships
 4th Mont Faron hill climb
 10th Paris–Roubaix
1965
 1st  Road race, UCI Road World Championships
 1st Giro di Lombardia
 1st London–Holyhead
 1st Six Days of Brussels (with Peter Post)
 2nd Six Days of Ghent (with Peter Post)
 2nd Overall Super Prestige Pernod International
 3rd Overall Midi Libre
 3rd La Flèche Wallonne
1st Mountains classification
 3rd Overall Circuit de Provençal
 3rd Bordeaux–Paris
 5th Harelbeke–Antwerp–Harelbeke
 6th Paris–Roubaix
 10th Liège–Bastogne–Liège
1966
 1st Stage 2b (TTT) Four Days of Dunkirk
 2nd Six Days of Münster (with Klaus Bugdahl)
 2nd Grand Prix of Aargau Canton
1967
 1st  Overall Paris–Nice
 Vuelta a España
1st Stages 5 & 16
 1st Isle of Man International
 1st Stage 5 Giro di Sardegna
 3rd Six Days of Antwerp (with Leo Proost and Emile Severeyns)
 4th Polymultipliée

Grand Tour general classification results timeline

Sources:

Monuments results timeline

Sources:

Awards and honours
 British Cycling Federation Personality of the Year: 1962, 1965
 BBC Sports Personality of the Year: 1965
 Bidlake Memorial Prize: 1965
 Daily Express'' Sportsman of the Year: 1965
 Freedom of Sint-Amandsberg: 1965
 Sports Journalists' Association Sportsman of the Year: 1965
 British Cycling Hall of Fame: 2010

See also

 List of British cyclists
 List of British cyclists who have led the Tour de France general classification
 List of Desert Island Discs episodes (1961–70)
 List of doping cases in cycling
 List of Olympic medalists in cycling (men)
 List of cyclists with a cycling-related death
 Yellow jersey statistics

Notes and references

Footnotes

References

Bibliography

Further reading

External links

 
 

1937 births
1967 deaths
BBC Sports Personality of the Year winners
British Vuelta a España stage winners
Burials in Nottinghamshire
Commonwealth Games silver medallists for England
Cyclists at the 1956 Summer Olympics
Cyclists at the 1958 British Empire and Commonwealth Games
Cyclists who died while racing
Doping cases in cycling
British male cyclists
English male cyclists
English sportspeople in doping cases
Filmed deaths in sports
Olympic bronze medallists for Great Britain
Olympic cyclists of Great Britain
Olympic medalists in cycling
Sport deaths in France
Sportspeople from County Durham
Sportspeople from Nottinghamshire
UCI Road World Champions (elite men)
Drug-related deaths in France
Medalists at the 1956 Summer Olympics
Commonwealth Games medallists in cycling
People from Haswell, County Durham
Medallists at the 1958 British Empire and Commonwealth Games